Hans Fischer (1881–1945) was German organic chemist.

Hans Fischer may also refer to:

Hans Fischer (painter) (1909–1958), Swiss painter
Hans Fischer (cyclist) (born 1961), Brazilian cyclist
Hans Fischer, CEO of Tata Steel Europe
Hans Fischerkoesen (1896–1973), also known Hans Fischer, German commercial animator

See also
Hans Vischer
Hank Fischer (born 1940), pitcher in Major League Baseball
Hans-Werner Fischer-Elfert (born 1954), German professor of Egyptology